Silence and Cry is a 1968 Hungarian drama film directed by Miklós Jancsó.

Plot
In 1919, after just a few months of communist rule, the Hungarian Republic of Councils was dissolved by a nationalist counter-revolution. Admiral Horthy, leader of the nationalists, assumed power as the Regent of Hungary. Hungarian Red Army soldiers were relentlessly pursued by the secret police and Hungarian Royal Gendarmerie and faced summary execution. One, István Cserzi, has fled to the Great Hungarian Plain and taken refuge on a farm run by two women. Due to their help and that of a childhood friend who is a commandant of the local Gendarmarie, István is relatively safe if he keeps out of sight. However, discovering that the women are slowly poisoning the husband of one of them and his mother, the farm's owners, István must decide whether to denounce them to the authorities at the likely cost of his own life.

Cast 
 Mari Törőcsik - Teréz
 József Madaras - Károly
 Zoltán Latinovits - Kémeri
 Andrea Drahota - Anna
 András Kozák - István
 István Bujtor - Kovács II.

References

External links 

1968 drama films
1968 films
Films directed by Miklós Jancsó
Hungarian drama films
1960s Hungarian-language films